Sweet William is a 1980 British drama film directed by Claude Whatham, produced by Don Boyd and starring Sam Waterston, Jenny Agutter, Anna Massey, Arthur Lowe, Geraldine James, Daphne Oxenford, Tim Pigott-Smith and Melvyn Bragg.
It is based on the 1975 novel of the same title by Beryl Bainbridge.

Cast
Sam Waterston - William McClusky 
Jenny Agutter - Ann Walton 
Anna Massey - Edna McClusky 
Arthur Lowe - Captain Walton 
Geraldine James - Pamela 
Daphne Oxenford - Mrs. Walton 
Peter Dean - Roddy 
Rachel Bell - Mrs. Kershaw 
Tim Pigott-Smith - Gerald 
Melvyn Bragg - Himself

Notes

External links
 

1980 films
British drama films
Films based on British novels
1980s English-language films
Films directed by Claude Whatham
1980s British films